The Federación de Scouts-Exploradores de España (ASDE, Federation of Spanish Scouts/Explorers) is a Spanish Scout association. It is one of the members of the Federación de Escultismo en España and thus of the World Organization of the Scout Movement. It serves 31,458 members (as of 2006).

History

The Exploradores de España, of whom ASDE claims to be heir, was founded in 1912 by Teodoro Iradier y Herrero and Arturo Cuyás under the name Exploradores de España - Boy-scouts españoles (Explorers of Spain - Spanish Boy-Scouts). It was among the founding members of the Boy Scouts' International Conference in 1920.

In 1940, after the Spanish Civil War the Exploradores de España were suspended by Franco's regime, but afterwards could continue their activities as Asociación Nacional de Exploradores de España (ANEDE, National Association of Spanish Explorers) with a semi-tolerated status.

The organization was fully legalized in 1977 under the name Asociación de Scouts de España  (The Scout Association of Spain) during the reforms after Franco's death. In 1978, it formed the Federación de Escultismo en España with the Movimiento Scout Católico and the Federació Catalana d'Escoltisme i Guiatge and was readmitted to the World Organization of the Scout Movement the same year.

Program

Program sections
The ASDE is divided in five sections according to age:
  (Beaver Scouts)—ages 6 to 8
  (Cub Scouts—ages 8 to 11
  (Scouts)—ages 11 to 14
  (Senior Scouts)—ages 14 to 16
  (Rover Scouts)—ages 16 to 21

Scout Motto
, Always Ready

Scout Oath

On my honor, I promise that I will do my best:
 To do my duty to God and the country,
 To help other people at all times and
 To obey the Scout Law.

Scout Law
 A Scout's honor is to be trusted
 A Scout is loyal to his country, his parents, his leaders and those under him
 A Scout's duty is to be useful and to help others without benefit
 A Scout is a friend to all and a brother to every other Scout
 A Scout is courteous and a gentlemen
 A Scout sees the work of God in nature. He loves animals and plants
 A Scout obeys orders without question and leaves nothing half done
 A Scout smiles and sings under all difficulties
 A Scout is thrifty and respects other people's property
 A Scout is clean in thought, word and deed

Regional organizations
The ASDE is a federation of independent regional organizations, organized according to the autonomous communities of Spain. Its members are:
 Andalucía: Scouts de Andalucía
 Aragón: Scouts de Aragón
 Principado De Asturias: Exploradores del Principado de Asturias
 Islas Baleares: Scouts de Baleares
 Islas Canarias: Scouts de Canarias
 Cantabria: Scouts de Cantabria
 Castilla La Mancha: Scouts de Castilla-La Mancha
 Castilla y León: Exploradores de Castilla y León
 Ceuta: Scouts de Ceuta
 Extremadura: Scouts de Extremadura
 Galicia: Scouts de Galicia
 La Rioja: Scouts de La Rioja
 Madrid: Exploradores de Madrid
 Melilla: Scouts de Melilla
 Región de Murcia: Exploradores de Murcia
 Comunitat Valenciana: Scouts Valencians
 Basque Country: Euskadiko Esploratzaileak

The organization has no groups in Catalonia or Navarre.

References

External links
 Official website

World Organization of the Scout Movement member organizations
Scouting and Guiding in Spain
Youth organizations established in 1912
1912 establishments in Spain